Debra Dawes (born 1955) is an Australian contemporary painter best known for her abstract paintings of gridlike structures and geometric patterns. She has been a practicing artist since the early 1980s and is seen as one of the leading figures in Australian abstract art. She has held over 25 solo exhibitions, been part of more than 60 group exhibitions and her works are held in national, state and private collections around Australia.

Biography 
Debra Dawes was born in Goondiwindi, Queensland, Australia on 9 May 1955. She currently travels between Coledale, Murrurundi and Sydney, NSW to live and work. Dawes met her now husband, Jelle van den Berg, in 1982. She traveled with him to The Netherlands and stayed there for 6 months before returning to Australia to continue her studies. During this time, they opened an art gallery, Union Street Gallery that continued into the 1990s.

Education 
In 1979, Dawes completed an Art Certificate at TAFE in Newcastle, Australia. She then went on to attain an Art Diploma at the College of Advanced Education in Newcastle 1980–82. In 1985, she obtained a Post-Graduate Diploma in Painting at Sydney College of the Arts. After studying in Sydney, Dawes moved to Murrurundi, NSW in order to support her family and to enable adequate working space for both her and her husband's artistic practices. Almost a decade later in 1994, Dawes began her doctorate of creative arts at the University of Wollongong, completing the degree in 2000.

Career 
Dawes' practice is based in reductive abstract paintings of alternating colours, patterns and geometric shapes. Dawes makes use of formal structures such as the grid, planes, volume, space and line. Her work discusses a wide range of topics and ideas ranging from examining and mediating personal experience, processing the relation between knowledge and experience, exploring feminist theory and power relationships, to analysis and critique of political language and structures. There have been various interpretations of her paintings including concepts of space as a social commentary, an invigorating perceptual experience, the exploration of the nature and form of the image in painting, to seduce and resist our gaze.

Exhibitions 
Dawes has held over 25 solo exhibitions from 1983 with her most recent being in 2017. She has exhibited across Australia in Melbourne, Sydney, Canberra and Perth and in Groningen, The Netherlands.   She has also exhibited in more than 60 group exhibitions from as early as 1984, both nationally throughout Australia and internationally in Italy, Hong Kong.

Recognition and awards 
Dawes has received numerous Australian grants and awards. She has been a recipient of the Australia Council grant four times, in 1990, 1994, 1997 and 2004, and in 2010 she was awarded the Redlands Westpac Art Prize.

Collections 
Dawes' artworks are held in many collections Australia wide. Her work is collected by the National Gallery of Australia, National Gallery of Victoria, Art Gallery of New South Wales, Art Gallery of Western Australia and the Queensland Art Gallery. Universities that collect her works are Murdoch University, the University of Queensland and the University of Wollongong. Her work is also collected by numerous regional and private collections such as Macquarie Bank, Artbank, Allen, Allen & Hemsley, Powerhouse Museum, Wesfarmers Arts, Cruthers Collection of Women's Art and the New England Regional Art Museum.

Notable works 
Starlite, 1993, Oil on Board, 240 x 390 cm 

Unfinished Business, 1998, Acrylic on polyester, 202.5 x 367 cm

References

1955 births
Living people
Australian painters